The 1897 Challenge Cup was the inaugural staging of the Northern Rugby Football Union's Challenge Cup and involved 52 clubs from across England from the 1896–97 Northern Rugby Football Union season. The tournament was played over six rounds in March and April 1897, culminating in the final which was won by Batley.

Background 

The Northern Union decided to hold a cup competition called the Northern Rugby Football Union Challenge Cup in July 1896. The cup was commissioned from Bradford silversmiths and jewellers, Fattorini and Sons.  Fattorini's designed the trophy themselves and it cost the Northern Union £60.

Draw 
The draw for the competition was made on 3 September 1896 although the matches were not due to be played until March and April 1897 over six consecutive weekends commencing 20 March 1897.  All rounds were drawn at the same time with matches in the second and subsequent rounds given an identification letter such that ties for later rounds were expressed as, for example, "Q. Winner of Round C. v. winner of Round N."

The team drawn first had the option to play at home or could agree to play at the opponent's ground.  The semi-finals and final were to be played at neutral venues.

First round 
The first round involved 20 matches and 40 clubs. 12 clubs (Batley, Bradford Church Hill, Brighouse Rangers, Crompton, Heckmondwike, Liversedge, St Helens Recs, Stockport, Swinton Church, Thornton Rangers, Tyldesley and Werneth) were given a bye to the next round.

All 20 ties were played on 20 March 1897.

First round replays
The three games requiring replays were all played on Wednesday 24 March

Second round
The second round of 16 ties was played on Saturday 27 March 1897.

Second round replay
Stockport and Eastmoor replayed the tie on Wednesday 31 March.

Third round
The third round of eight games was played on Saturday 3 April.

Third round replay
Swinton and Rochdale replayed the drawn game on Wednesday 7 April.

Fourth round
The quarter finals were played on Saturday 10 April 1897.

Semi-finals
The semi-finals were scheduled for Saturday 17 April.  However, due to a waterlogged pitch, the tie between St. Helens and Swinton, due to be played at Broughton Rangers ground - Wheater's Field -  was postponed until Monday 19 April.  The game between Batley and Warrington, played at Fartown, Huddersfield did go ahead on a very soft pitch.

After the game Warrington lodged a protest over the result, claiming that the game should have been postponed due to the state of the pitch and that the game having gone ahead, the referee allowed the game to end six minutes short.  Both grounds of protest were dismissed by the Northern Union Committee.

The rearranged game between St Helens and Swinton was played on Easter Monday, 19 April, watched by a crowd of 20,000 taking advantage of the bank holiday to attend.

Final

The final took place on 24 April 1897 at Headingley, Leeds. The official attendance was 13,492, with gate receipts of £624.17s.7d. Batley wore white shirts and black shorts and socks in place of their normal cerise and fawn colours.  St Helens wore blue and white hooped shirts, white shorts and black socks.

St Helens won the toss and elected to have Batley kick off.  Despite playing into the wind in the first half, Batley took the lead after five minutes when  Joe Oakland, kicked a drop goal to give Batley a 4–0 advantage.  Batley extended their lead to 7–0 when  John Goodall scored the first try of the game.  These were the only scores of the first half.  Early in the second half St Helens scored a try when centre David Traynor took the ball on the halfway line and beat four Batley players before touching down.  The St Helens fightback did not last long as Batley flanker John T. 'Paudy' Munns scored Batley's second try to make the score 10–3 which remained the score at the final whistle.

After the game the cup was presented by Mrs Louisa Waller, the wife of the president of the Northern Union, Henry Hirst Waller.  Mrs Waller presented the Batley players with commemorative gold medals and the St Helens players with silver medals.

Squads

References

Challenge Cup
Challenge Cup
Challenge Cup